Toenailing or skew-nailing is the driving of a nail at a roughly 45-degree angle to fasten two pieces of wood together, typically with their grains perpendicular.  A common example is toenailing a wall stud to a sole plate in stud framing.

Toenails are typically driven in opposing pairs when possible, or pairs of pairs when appropriate.  The angled nailing makes later dismantling difficult or destructive.

Another common application of toenailing is attaching a rafter to the top plate of a wall at its birdsmouth. Alternatives to toenailing include the use of joist hangers, hurricane ties, and other engineered steel connectors designed to drive nails on a perpendicular to a wood surface.

Skew nailing is also a technique used by other woodworkers, for example a drawer or box can be glued and skew-nailed with finer nails or panel pins. Skew nailing will fasten the joint, while the glue sets, avoiding the use of clamps. A variation of toenailing is to use screws, casually known as "toe-screwing".

References

Reader's Digest, (1973). Reader's Digest Complete Do-it-yourself Manual, p. 384 and p. 392. Reader's Digest, New York. Lib. of Congress Catalog Card 72-87867.
Jackson and Day, (2001). Collins Complete DIY Manual, p. 143. HarperCollins, London. .

Joinery
Woodworking